Quşçular (also, Kushchular) is a village and municipality in the Goranboy Rayon of Azerbaijan.  It has a population of 749.

References 

Populated places in Goranboy District